Emmanuel Ocran (born February 19, 1996) is a Ghanaian footballer currently playing for Gibraltar Football League side Manchester 62.

Club career
Emmanuel Ocran was part of the Wa All Stars team that won the 2016 Ghana Premier League. On 15 February 2017, Ocran joined United Soccer League side Real Monarchs on loan from All Stars. In September 2019, he moved back to Ghana and joined Ghana Premier League side Dreams FC.

On 17 July 2021, he joined Gibraltar National League side Lincoln Red Imps F.C. on a year-long loan.

International career
Ocran was called up to the Ghana national team in August 2016 for their 2017 Africa Cup of Nations qualifiers.

Honours

Club 
Wa All Stars

 Ghana Premier League: 2016
 Ghana Super Cup: 2017

Individual 

 Kuntu Blankson's Player of the Season: 2015–2016

References

External links
 

1996 births
Living people
Ghanaian footballers
Ghanaian expatriate footballers
Association football forwards
Real Monarchs players
Dreams F.C. (Ghana) players
USL Championship players
Ghanaian expatriate sportspeople in the United States
Expatriate soccer players in the United States
Ghana international footballers
Ghanaian expatriate sportspeople in Gibraltar
Expatriate footballers in Gibraltar